Sausal Creek is a  northwesterly-flowing stream originating in Portola Valley along the northeastern edge of the Windy Hill Open Space Preserve in the eastern foothills of the Santa Cruz Mountains, in San Mateo County, California, United States. It joins a nexus of creeks becoming Corte Madera Creek in a natural marsh above Searsville Reservoir on Stanford University lands. Below Searsville Reservoir, Corte Madera Creek joins with Bear Creek to form San Francisquito Creek  and flows to San Francisco Bay.

History
Historically, Sausal Creek also had the names Arroyo Sausal, Arroyo del Sanjon and Sanjon Creek. On the 1899 Palo Alto Topo Map its mainstem was called Corte de Madera Creek and its Neils Gulch tributary was called Sausal Creek. Sausal Creek flows through the Rancho Cañada del Corte de Madera meaning "a place where wood is cut", reflecting the importance of the timber industry in the early days of Portola Valley. "Sausal" is derived from the Spanish word "Sauce" or "Sauz" and mean "willow grove", a name that appears as early as 1853.

Bozzo Gulch is named for Emmanuel Bozzo who had a ranch at the head of the canyon in the 1860s.

Neils Gulch seems to have been modified from Neel Gulch, after David H. Neel, an 1850s settler. It also was called Cañada de Sansevan and Hallidie Gulch.

Bull Run Creek was named by a Southern sympathizer following the Union defeat at the Battle of Bull Run in the early 1860s. It has also been known as Sausal Creek, Willow Creek, Kelley Gulch, Uval Creek, Cañada de Sansevan for William Nichols Sansevain and Smith Gulch, for William R. Smith's steam-powered sawmill.

Watershed
Sausal Creek heads just west of Willowbrook Drive in Portola Valley and is circled by the Spring Ridge Trail and Betsy Crowder Trail where it is dammed to form Sausal Pond. After receiving Bozzo Gulch, Niels Gulch and Bull Run Creek from the left. It runs northwest in the San Andreas Fault zone and after crossing Family Farm Road off Portola Road it is one of a nexus of half a dozen creeks that coalesce in a large natural freshwater marsh to form Corte Madera Creek. Dennis Martin Creek flows into Sausal Creek just upstream of the reservoir area at the Family Farm Road bridge. From there Sausal Creek enters Searsville Reservoir. Old maps suggest that Dennis Martin Creek and Alambique Creek were tributary to Sausal Creek.

Conservation
For decades a 630 feet long section of Sausal Creek was buried in an underground culvert. In a compromise between creek preservationists and those who wanted a larger softball field, half the creek was daylighted along with construction of the new Portola Valley Town Center.

See also
List of watercourses in the San Francisco Bay Area

References

External links
Sausal Creek Daylighting
San Francisquito Watershed & Alluvial Fan at Oakland Museum of California website
San Francisquito Watershed Council
Upper Watershed San Francisquito Creek Watershed prepared by the Oakland Museum of California
The Creeks that Flow through Woodside by the Bear Creek League of Advocates for the Watershed (Bear CLAW)

Woodside, California
Portola Valley, California
Rivers of San Mateo County, California
Rivers of Northern California
Tributaries of San Francisquito Creek